Ouk Sreymom (born 3 April 1975) is a Cambodian pétanque player.

Biography 
At the Pétanque World Championships, Sreymom won gold in the singles category in 2017. She also won gold in the precision shooting category in 2021 and three bronze medals in the triple category in 2013, 2017 and 2019. At the 2022 World Games, Sreymom won both gold medals at the precision shooting and doubles category.

References

1975 births
Living people
Cambodian sportswomen
Cambodian pétanque players
Competitors at the 2007 Southeast Asian Games
Competitors at the 2009 Southeast Asian Games
Competitors at the 2013 Southeast Asian Games
Competitors at the 2015 Southeast Asian Games
Competitors at the 2017 Southeast Asian Games
Competitors at the 2021 Southeast Asian Games
Southeast Asian Games gold medalists for Cambodia
Southeast Asian Games silver medalists for Cambodia
Southeast Asian Games bronze medalists for Cambodia
Competitors at the 2022 World Games
World Games gold medalists
20th-century Cambodian women
21st-century Cambodian women